Emilio López may refer to:

Emilio López (basketball) (born 1923), Mexican former basketball player
Emilio López (equestrian) (1892-1958), Spanish Olympic equestrian
Emilio López Adán (born 1946), Spanish doctor and writer
Emilio López (Spanish footballer) (born 1965), Spanish former footballer
Emilio López (Mexican footballer) (born 1986), Mexican footballer